A roundhead was a type of mace used during the English Civil War. In 1643 an article in Mercurius Civicus claimed the weapon was called a roundhead by the Cavaliers because they were to be used to beat the Roundheads into subjection.

References and notes

Attribution:

Polearms